Louis-Marie de Blignières, civil name Olivier de Blignières (born 11 April 1949 in Madrid) is a French traditionalist Catholic priest, and the founder of the Fraternity of Saint Vincent Ferrer.

Biography 

The son of Hervé Le Barbier de Blignières, he was born in Madrid in 1949. He did primary and secondary in classics at Paris (1956-1967), and higher studies in science at L'école Sainte-Geneviève de Versailles and the Faculté des Sciences d'Orsay (1967-1972). He obtained a master's in Mathematics-Physics and a Certificate of Higher Studies in Astrophysics.

He entered an apostolic Benedictine community in Martigny in Valais in Switzerland (1972-1975) and studied in the Econe Seminary. While there, he was influenced by Dominican theologian Michel-Louis Guérard des Lauriers, who was then a professor at the seminary. He was ordained a priest of the Society of Saint Pius X in 1977 by Archbishop Marcel Lefebvre. 

In 1979, he came to hold the Thesis of Cassiciacum proposed by des Lauriers. He also received the Dominican habit from des Lauriers and founded the Fraternity of Saint Vincent Ferrer at Chémeré-le-Roi in Mayenne. However, by 1987, he and his community abandoned their support of sedeprivationism and entered into full communion with the Catholic Church. The community uses the Dominican Rite and the Dominican Breviary due to an indult granted to them by Pope John Paul II in 1988. He was the community's prior until 2011.

He gave a course in Thomist spirituality in Paris and preached retreats on the Rosary, afterwards he became known for his retreats and preaching. He also actively joins the annual Chartres Pilgrimage with fellow traditionalists in full communion.

In 2003, he defended a doctoral thesis entitled La quête de la Ratio Entis: un itinéraire thomasien à l'Université Paris-Sorbonne. The director of his thesis was Michel Podgorny.		

He is the author of the books Les fins dernières and other books. He leads the training seminars for students and young professionals, (Café-Caté), in the Latin Quarter of Paris.

Works

See also 
 Fraternity of Saint Vincent Ferrer
 Catholic traditionalism

References

External links 

French traditionalist Catholics
1949 births
Living people
French Roman Catholic priests
20th-century French Catholic theologians
Traditionalist Catholic priests